Tropical Storm Clotilda was a destructive tropical cyclone that inundated Réunion in February 1987. A tropical disturbance first formed between Madagascar and Réunion on February 9 and slowly intensified thereafter. After passing near Réunion, it began to weaken. On February 16, however, Clotilda began to regain strength, and reached its secondary peak on February 17. Two days later, Clotilda became an extratropical cyclone. By February 22, Clotilda was no long being tracked by meteorologists. While active, it brought torrential rains to the island of Réunion during a span of 72 hours. However, the peak total measured in Hyacinthe was lower than the total measured during Clotilda. Furthermore, about 250 homes were damaged and roughly 120 homes were destroyed. Eighty-nine trees were also brought down during the storm. Throughout the island, damage totaled $2 million (1987 USD) and 10 people were killed. In addition to the destruction on Réunion, 5% of crops on Mauritius were impacted by the storm. During the aftermath of the cyclone, 1,000 people on Réunion were evacuated to shelters.

Meteorological history

The tropical disturbance that would later become Clotilda was first warned on by Météo-France's (MFR) meteorological office at Réunion at 0600 UTC on February 9. However, the strengthening trend was short lived, and several hours later, MFR downgraded Clotilda into a tropical depression as it began to meander. At 0600 UTC on February 11, the Joint Typhoon Warning Center (JTWC) issued its first warning on the system. That day, Clotilda began to re-intensify and MFR upgraded Clotilda into a moderate tropical storm for the second time. At 1200 UTC that day, the JTWC reported that Clotilda developed gale-force winds. Data from both agencies suggest that the storm held on to its intensity for about a day before gradually intensifying while turning east, passing within  Réunion. At 1800 UTC on February 12, the JTWC reported that Clotilda had reached its peak intensity of  while MFR upgraded Clotilda into a severe tropical storm.

Moreover, MFR reduced to intensity of Clotilda to  the next day. Thereafter, Clotilda turned west and began to reintensify. Accelerating, the storm transitioned into an extratropical cyclone on February 19 while turning south and later southeast. At 0000 UTC on February 22, MFR at last stopped monitoring the system.

Impact and aftermath
This resulted in several homes being flooded and about 5% of the island's sugar crop being damaged.

However, this total was significantly less than the peak total of  recorded at Commerson during Hyacinthe. Throughout the island, rainfall totals usually exceeded the totals measured during Hyacinthe. Major flooding was reported, damaging many roads, and 89 trees fell during the storm. A total 250 dwellings were damaged and nearly 120 others were completely destroyed, with several completely destroyed. This left around 4,000 people homeless. In all, damage from the storm totaled $2 million (1987 USD). A total of 40,000 people were affected by the storm. Clotilda killed 10 people on the island.

Following the storm on Réunion, "tens of millions of francs" were needed to repair damaged roads. Furthermore, 1,000 people moved to emergency shelters. On February 18, 250,000 Euros were granted to nation to cope with the aftermath of Clotilda. According to one account, it took five days for most food items to be restored to the island.

Notes

See also
Tropical cyclones in the Mascarene Islands
Cyclone Hyacinthe
Cyclone Dina

References

Clotilda
Clotilda
Clotilda
Clotilda